Afif Safieh (born 4 May 1950) is a Palestinian diplomat. He has served as a Palestinian delegate to the Netherlands (1987-1990), to the United Kingdom (1990-2005), the Holy See, Vatican (1995-2005), and in Washington as the head of the PLO mission. He was most recently the Palestinian ambassador to the Russian Federation.

Afif Safieh is considered the most experienced and skilled Palestinian diplomat having served in the three most politically significant capitals: London, Washington, and Moscow.

Biography 
Safieh was born in Jerusalem in 1950 to a Christian family. As a child, he attended school in Jerusalem's College Des Frères.

He is married to Christ'l Leclercq and has two daughters: Diana and Randa.

Career 
In 1972, he obtained a degree in Political Science and International Relations from the Catholic University of Louvain, Belgium.  He continued his education at the Paris Institute of Political Studies in Paris, graduating in 1974.

Safieh became president of the Belgian section of the General Union of Palestinian Students from 1969 until 1971, then President of the French branch in 1974-1975.

From 1976 to 1978 he served as deputy director of the Palestine Liberation Organization Observer Mission to the United Nations Office at Geneva. In 1978 he worked as a staff member in Yasser Arafat's office in Beirut, in charge of European Affairs and UN institutions. In 1981, he became a researcher at the Centre for European Studies in the Catholic University of Louvain, and from 1985 to 1987 was invited as visiting scholar at the Centre for International Affairs, Harvard University.

From 1987 until 1990, Safieh served as PLO representative to the Netherlands.  During his service, he was involved in the 1988 Stockholm negotiations that led to the first official and direct American-Palestinian dialogue. In 1990, he became Palestinian General Delegate to the United Kingdom.  In January 1995, he was invited to join the International Board of Trustees of the Vatican-sponsored Bethlehem University.  Nominated Palestinian General Delegate to the Holy See, he presented his letter of credentials to Pope John Paul II on November 6, 1995.

On October 27, 2005 he was appointed to head the PLO office to the United States, Washington, DC. He only served in Washington for two and a half years, having lectured students and US citizens from the west coast to the east coast about the Palestinian struggle at a wide range of universities and institutes.

In May 2008, Afif Safieh was appointed to serve as the Palestinian ambassador to the Russian Federation, he presented his letter of credentials to President Medvedev on September 18, 2008. It was reported in March 2009 that he had been dismissed from this post by Palestinian president Mahmoud Abbas, apparently because he had spoken at a rally organised by Hamas to protest against the Israeli attack on Gaza.

Afif Safieh was nominated in June 2009 as Palestinian Roving Ambassador for Special Missions, based in London.

During the Fateh sixth national conference held in Bethlehem, August 2009, Ambassador Safieh was elected to the Fateh Revolutionary Council - the parliament of the Fateh movement.

In October 2009, Safieh was invited by the Commissioner for International Relations for the Fateh movement Dr Nabil Sha'ath to be Deputy Commissioner for International Relations.

See also
Palestinian Christians

References

External links
Video of Speech at World Affairs Council of Northern California (August 2006)
Announcement of appointment as envoy to the United States, from the Washington Report on Middle East Affairs
Palestinian Envoy Brings New Strategy to Washington, from the Forward
The Anatomy of the PLO Mission in Washington, from the Al-Jazeerah Information Center

1950 births
Ambassadors of the State of Palestine to the United Kingdom
Ambassadors of the State of Palestine to Russia
Harvard University staff
Living people
Palestinian Christians
Palestinian diplomats
People from Jerusalem
Sciences Po alumni
Université catholique de Louvain alumni
Ambassadors of the State of Palestine to the United States
Ambassadors of the State of Palestine to the Netherlands